Lee Eun-chul (Korean: 이은철; born January 3, 1967) is a South Korean rifle shooter who was the first Korean to compete at five Olympic Games (1984 to 2000). He reached the 1992 and 1996 Olympic finals in 50 metre rifle prone, the first time advancing from 8th position to winning the gold medal. He also won two golds at the World Championships, four golds at the Asian Championships, and five golds at the Asian Games.

He turned down offers of undergraduate study at the Massachusetts Institute of Technology and West Point and chose to study computer science at Texas Lutheran University so that he would be better able to balance the demands of his sport with getting an education.

He is now a successful businessman in the high tech industry.

References 

 
 

1967 births
Living people
South Korean male sport shooters
ISSF rifle shooters
Olympic shooters of South Korea
Olympic gold medalists for South Korea
Shooters at the 1984 Summer Olympics
Shooters at the 1988 Summer Olympics
Shooters at the 1992 Summer Olympics
Shooters at the 1996 Summer Olympics
Shooters at the 2008 Summer Olympics
Olympic medalists in shooting
Asian Games medalists in shooting
Shooters at the 1986 Asian Games
Shooters at the 1990 Asian Games
Shooters at the 1994 Asian Games
Shooters at the 1998 Asian Games
Medalists at the 1992 Summer Olympics
Asian Games gold medalists for South Korea
Asian Games silver medalists for South Korea
Medalists at the 1986 Asian Games
Medalists at the 1990 Asian Games
Medalists at the 1994 Asian Games
Medalists at the 1998 Asian Games
20th-century South Korean people
21st-century South Korean people